Silke Preuß (born 5 October 1965) is a German sailor. She competed in the women's 470 event at the 1988 Summer Olympics.

References

External links
 

1965 births
Living people
German female sailors (sport)
Olympic sailors of East Germany
Sailors at the 1988 Summer Olympics – 470
Sportspeople from Berlin